Kındıra can refer to:

 Kındıra, Bolu
 Kındıra, Yeniçağa